GI Partners is a leading upper middle market private equity firm based in San Francisco, California.

Description 

Founded in 2001, GI Partners is a private investment firm with over 100 employees with offices in San Francisco, New York, Chicago, Greenwich, CT, and Scottsdale, AZ. The firm has raised over $29 billion in capital from leading institutional investors around the world to invest in private equity, real estate, and data infrastructure strategies. The private equity team invests primarily in companies in the healthcare, IT infrastructure, services, and software sectors. The real estate team focuses primarily on technology and life sciences properties as well as other specialized types of real estate. The data infrastructure team invests primarily in hard asset infrastructure businesses underpinning the digital economy.

In March 2018, GI Partners acquired a majority stake in Doxim from Strattam Capital. 

In January 2020, GI Partners acquired a majority interest in DRFortress, the largest data center operator based in Hawaii.

In November 2020, bought Valet Living, the largest amenities provider to the multifamily housing industry in the US. It was founded in 1995

In April 2022, GI Partners announced its agreement to acquire the US based cloud software solutions company GTY Technology Holdings Inc. Upon completion of the transaction GTY will become a privately held company, with the agreement stating shareholders will gain $6.30 per share of GTY stock.

References

External links
GI Partners

Financial services companies established in 2001
Private equity firms of the United States
Companies based in San Francisco